The Camp is the term used in the Falkland Islands to refer to any part of the islands outside the islands' only significant town, Stanley, and often the large RAF base at Mount Pleasant. It is derived from the Spanish word , for "countryside".

The Camp contains various small settlements, such as Fox Bay, Goose Green, Darwin, and Port Howard, which are usually little more than several houses. Port Louis in the north of East Falkland is the oldest permanent settlement in the islands, established by the French in 1764. Port Egmont on Saunders Island, now abandoned, is the oldest British settlement. The majority of the Camp population lives on East Falkland, followed by West Falkland. Outlying islands such as Pebble, Sea Lion, West Point, Weddell and Carcass Island are inhabited as well. Camp is used in formal contexts: e.g. the Falkland Islands Legislative Assembly has Stanley and Camp constituencies.

There are also some British military installations such as RAF Mount Pleasant, Mare Harbour, and Mount Alice, and there is also the Bodie Suspension Bridge, the southernmost of its kind in the world. Many parts were landmined from the time of the Falklands War, particularly just outside Stanley. As of November 2020, the Falklands were declared clear of all landmines.

Officially, the Falklands use UTC-3 year-round (before September 2010, only in the summer months), but many residents of Camp use UTC-4 all year, known on the Falklands as "Camp Time". This caused confusion in 2009 when a team of Royal Engineers working in Hill Cove did not realise West Falkland was on a different time zone from Stanley.

Sheep farming is the main industry. Others include fishing, and tourism, particularly wildlife or war-related tours. The Camp is represented by three members of the Legislative Assembly of the Falkland Islands, currently Roger Edwards, Ian Hansen, and Teslyn Barkman.

See also
 Falkland Islands
 West Falkland
 Lafonia
 Geography of the Falkland Islands
 Falklands War

References

Falkland Islands culture